Music Hour (ミュージック・アワー) is the third single by the Japanese pop-rock band Porno Graffitti. It was released on July 12, 2000.

The song was used in a promotion for Otsuka Pharmaceutical's Pocari Sweat. A cover of the song was performed by Poppin'Party and released as part of the BanG Dream! Girls Band Party! Cover Collection Vol. 4 in 2020.

Track listing

References

2000 singles
Porno Graffitti songs
2000 songs
SME Records singles